The Tanzer 27 is a Canadian sailboat, that was designed by C. Raymond Hunt and first built in 1982. The design is out of production.

The Tanzer 27 is a development of the Paceship PY 26, which was produced by Paceship Yachts in Mahone Bay, Nova Scotia, up until 1977. After 1977 production was assumed by the AMF Corporation in Connecticut, United States. Tanzer Industries of Dorion, Quebec obtained the Paceship molds in the early 1980s and developed the design into the Tanzer 27, which is slightly longer overall than the PY 26.

Production
Production of the boat was commenced in 1982 by Tanzer Industries. The company entered bankruptcy in May 1986 and production had ended by that time.

Design
The Tanzer 27 is a small recreational keelboat, built predominantly of fibreglass, with wood trim. It has a masthead sloop rig, a transom-hung rudder and a fixed fin keel or optionally, a shoal-draft keel. It displaces  and carries  of ballast.

The design differs from the PY 26 in that it has deck-stepped mast in place of the keel-stepped mast and different interior.

The boat with the standard keel has a PHRF racing average handicap of 204, with a high of 198 and a low of 210. With the shoal draft keel the PHRF racing average handicap is 231.

See also
List of sailing boat types

Similar sailboats
Aloha 27
Cal 27
Cal 2-27
Cal 3-27
Catalina 27
Catalina 270
Catalina 275 Sport
C&C 27
Crown 28
CS 27
Edel 820
Express 27
Fantasia 27
Halman Horizon
Hullmaster 27
Hunter 27
Hunter 27-2
Hunter 27-3
Irwin 27 
Island Packet 27
Mirage 27 (Perry)
Mirage 27 (Schmidt)
Mirage 275
O'Day 272

References

Keelboats
1980s sailboat type designs
Sailing yachts
Sailboat type designs by C. Raymond Hunt Associates
Sailboat types built by Tanzer Industries